Zehmer Farm is a historic home and farm complex located near McKenney, Dinwiddie County, Virginia. The farmhouse was built about 1905, and is a one-story, frame L-shaped dwelling with a broad hipped roof and wings added to both sides. Also on the property are a collection of outbuildings and farm structures – including animal shelters, corn crib, flue-cured tobacco barns, dairy barn and milk houses, and the sites of tenant houses, a butcher house, fire-cured tobacco barns and a sawmill.

It was listed on the National Register of Historic Places in 2009.

References

Houses on the National Register of Historic Places in Virginia
Farms on the National Register of Historic Places in Virginia
National Register of Historic Places in Dinwiddie County, Virginia
Houses completed in 1905
Houses in Dinwiddie County, Virginia
1905 establishments in Virginia